Sarabjit or Sarbjit is a gender-neutral Punjabi Indian and Pakistani given name. Notable people with the name include:

 Rai Sarabjit Singh (1853-1910), Indian ruler of a princely state
 Sarabjit Ladda (born 1982), Indian cricketer
 Sarabjit Singh (1963/1964–2013), Indian national convicted of terrorism in Pakistan
 Sarabjit Singh Dhillon, Indian general
 Sarbjit Cheema, Punjabi singer
 Sarbjit Dusang (born 1952), Canadian field hockey player 
 Sarbjit Singh Chadha (born 1952), Indian singer

Indian masculine given names